Rose Davies may refer to:

Rose Davies (activist) (1882–1958), Welsh activist
Rose Davies (athlete) (born 1999), Australian runner